Parents: David Buchanan, Moira Buchanan
Siblings: Tony Buchanan
Spouse: Janette Buchanan
Child: Jamie Buchanan
Niece: Francesca Buchanan
''David Buchanan.(born 23 June 1962), also known as Dave Buchanan, is an English former professional footballer who played as a striker in the Football League for Leicester City, Northampton Town, Peterborough United, Sunderland and York City, and in non-League football for North Shields, Blyth Spartans and Newcastle Blue Star. He represented the England national youth team in 1979 and earned two caps with the semi-professional national team in 1986.

References

1962 births
Living people
Footballers from Newcastle upon Tyne
English footballers
England youth international footballers
England semi-pro international footballers
Association football forwards
Leicester City F.C. players
Northampton Town F.C. players
Peterborough United F.C. players
North Shields F.C. players
Blyth Spartans A.F.C. players
Sunderland A.F.C. players
York City F.C. players
Newcastle Blue Star F.C. players
English Football League players